This is a list of foreign players in the A-League Men, which commenced play in 2005. The following players must meet both of the following two criteria:
Have played in at least one A-League Men game (including finals). Players who were signed by A-League clubs, but only played in cup and/or continental games, or did not play in any competitive games at all, are not included.
Are considered foreign, i.e., outside Australia and New Zealand determined by the following:
A player is considered foreign if he is not eligible to play for the national team of Australia or New Zealand.
More specifically,
If a player has been capped on international level, the national team is used; if he has been capped by more than one country, the highest level (or the most recent) team is used. These include Australia/New Zealand players with dual citizenship.
If a player has not been capped on international level, his country of birth is used, except those who were born abroad from Australian parents or moved to Australia at a young age, and those who clearly indicated to have switched his nationality to another nation.

Clubs listed are those for which the player has played at least one A-League Men game. Note that calendar years are used. This follows general practice in expressing years a player spent at club.

As of 19 February 2023, 89 different nations have been represented in the A-League Men. Paraguay is the most recent nation to be represented with Fernando Romero debuting for Melbourne Victory on 18 February 2023.

In bold: players who are currently at an A-League Men club.



Albania
 Migjen Basha – Melbourne Victory – 2019–20

Algeria
 Karim Matmour – Adelaide United – 2017

Argentina

 Fernando Brandán – Melbourne City – 2016–17
 Marcelo Carrusca – Adelaide United – 2012–17, Melbourne City – 2017–18, Western Sydney Wanderers – 2018
 Nicolás Colazo – Melbourne City – 2016–17
 Matías Córdoba – Perth Glory – 2013
 Oscar Roberto Cornejo – Wellington Phoenix – 2010–11
 Jorge Drovandi – Newcastle Jets – 2007
 Marcos Flores – Adelaide United – 2010–11, Melbourne Victory – 2012–13, Central Coast Mariners – 2013–14, Newcastle Jets – 2014–15
 Jonatan Germano – Melbourne City – 2011–15
 Juan Lescano – Brisbane Roar – 2021–22
 Nicolás Martínez – Western Sydney Wanderers – 2016–17
 Jerónimo Neumann – Adelaide United – 2012–14, Newcastle Jets – 2014–15
 Patricio Pérez – Central Coast Mariners – 2010–11
 Patito Rodríguez – Newcastle Jets – 2018
 Matías Sánchez – Melbourne Victory – 2017–18
 Adrian Trinidad – Perth Glory – 2008–09

Austria
 Marcel Canadi – Brisbane Roar – 2023–
 Kristijan Dobras – Melbourne Victory – 2019–20
 Marc Janko – Sydney FC – 2014–15
 Richard Kitzbichler – Melbourne Victory – 2005–06
 Richard Windbichler – Melbourne City – 2019–20

Bahrain
 Sayed Mohamed Adnan – Brisbane Roar – 2011–12

Barbados
 Paul Ifill – Wellington Phoenix – 2009–14

Belgium
 Geoffrey Claeys – Melbourne Victory – 2005–06
 Pieter Collen – Brisbane Roar – 2010
 Ritchie De Laet – Melbourne City – 2018–19
 Stein Huysegems – Wellington Phoenix – 2012–14

Benin
 Rudy Gestede – Melbourne Victory – 2020–21

Bosnia and Herzegovina
 Sulejman Krpić – Western Sydney Wanderers – 2022–23

Brazil

 Alemão – Adelaide United – 2008–10
 Alessandro – Melbourne Victory – 2007
 Amaral – Perth Glory – 2008–09
 Anderson – Gold Coast United – 2010–11
 Andrezinho – Perth Glory – 2011–12
 Bobô – Sydney FC – 2016–18, 2021–22
 Bruno Cazarine – Sydney FC – 2010–12
 Claudinho – Melbourne Victory – 2006–07
 Cleberson – Wellington Phoenix – 2007
 Cristiano – Adelaide United – 2008–10
 Denni – Newcastle Jets – 2007–08
 Diego – Adelaide United – 2006–09, Wellington Phoenix – 2010–11
 Ney Fabiano – Melbourne Victory – 2008–09
 Fabinho – Melbourne Victory – 2011–12, Sydney FC – 2012–13
 Felipe – Wellington Phoenix – 2007–08
 Gui Finkler – Melbourne Victory – 2012–16, Wellington Phoenix – 2016–17
 Fred – Melbourne Victory – 2006–07, Wellington Phoenix – 2008, Melbourne Heart – 2011–13
 George – Wellington Phoenix – 2007
 Jair – Newcastle Jets – 2018–19, Central Coast Mariners – 2019–20
 Mário Jardel – Newcastle Jets – 2007–08
 Jefferson – Gold Coast United – 2009–10
 Juninho – Sydney FC – 2007–08
 Leandro Love – Melbourne Victory – 2007–08
 Marcelo – Western Sydney Wanderers – 2022–
 Leonardo – Newcastle Jets – 2015–16
 Marcinho – Queensland Roar – 2007–08
 Maycon – Melbourne Heart – 2011–12
 Milson – Gold Coast United – 2009–10
 Moresche – Central Coast Mariners – 2021–
 Patrick – Sydney FC – 2007–08
 Daniel Penha – Newcastle Jets – 2021–22
 Reinaldo – Brisbane Roar – 2005–10
 Bernardo Ribeiro – Newcastle Jets – 2012–13
 Ricardinho – Melbourne Victory – 2010–11
 Robson – Gold Coast United – 2009–12
 Romário – Adelaide United – 2006
 Vítor Saba – Western Sydney Wanderers – 2014–15
 Yan Sasse – Wellington Phoenix – 2022–
 Sidnei – Perth Glory – 2013–16
 Alex Terra – Melbourne Heart – 2010–12
 Tiago – Newcastle Jets – 2011–13, Sydney FC – 2013–14
 Marco Túlio – Central Coast Mariners – 2022–

Bulgaria
 Bozhidar Kraev – Wellington Phoenix – 2022–

Burundi
 Elvis Kamsoba – Melbourne Victory – 2019–21, Sydney FC – 2021–22
 Pacifique Niyongabire – Adelaide United – 2018–2021, Perth Glory – 2021–22

Cameroon
 Olivier Boumal – Newcastle Jets – 2021–22

Canada
 Alen Marcina – New Zealand Knights – 2006–07
 Issey Nakajima-Farran – Brisbane Roar – 2011–12

Chile
 Pablo Contreras – Melbourne Victory – 2013–14

China
 Gao Leilei – New Zealand Knights – 2006–07, Wellington Phoenix – 2008
 Jiang Chen – Wellington Phoenix – 2009
 Li Yan – New Zealand Knights – 2006
 Ma Leilei – Newcastle Jets – 2016–17
 Qu Shengqing – Adelaide United – 2005–07
 Zhang Shuo – Newcastle Jets – 2010–11
 Zhang Xiaobin – New Zealand Knights – 2005–06
 Zhang Yuning – Queensland Roar – 2006–07

Colombia
 Milton Rodríguez – Newcastle Jets – 2006–07

Costa Rica
 Marvin Angulo – Melbourne Victory – 2009–10
 Steven Bryce – Brisbane Roar – 2010
 Kenny Cunningham – Wellington Phoenix – 2013–15
 Carlos Hernández – Melbourne Victory – 2007–12, Wellington Phoenix – 2013–14
 José Luis López – Melbourne Victory – 2008–09
 Jean Carlos Solórzano – Brisbane Roar – 2010–11, 2014–16, Melbourne Victory – 2011–12
 Marco Ureña – Central Coast Mariners – 2020–22

Croatia
 Dario Bodrušić – Adelaide United – 2011
 Mate Dragičević – Perth Glory – 2007
 Dario Jertec – Western United – 2019–20
 Krunoslav Lovrek – Sydney FC – 2012–13
 Ivan Kelava – Melbourne Victory – 2021–22
 Dino Kresinger – Western Sydney Wanderers – 2012–13
 Goran Paracki – Wellington Phoenix – 2017–18
 Mateo Poljak – Western Sydney Wanderers – 2012–15, Newcastle Jets – 2015–17
 Josip Tadić – Melbourne Heart – 2012–13

Curaçao
 Roly Bonevacia – Wellington Phoenix – 2014–17, Western Sydney Wanderers – 2017–19
 Dyron Daal – North Queensland Fury – 2009–11
 Guyon Fernandez – Perth Glory – 2015–16
 Darryl Lachman – Perth Glory – 2020–
 Michaël Maria – Adelaide United – 2019–20

Denmark
 Johan Absalonsen – Adelaide United – 2017–18
 Jesper Håkansson – Newcastle Jets – 2008–09
 Ken Ilsø – Adelaide United – 2018–19
 Michael Jakobsen – Melbourne City – 2016–18, Adelaide United – 2018–22
 Thomas Kristensen – Brisbane Roar – 2016–19
 Tobias Mikkelsen – Brisbane Roar – 2018–19
 Morten Nordstrand – Newcastle Jets – 2016–17
 Jakob Poulsen – Melbourne Victory – 2019–20
 Thomas Sørensen – Melbourne City – 2015–17

DR Congo
Yeni Ngbakoto – Western Sydney Wanderers – 2022–

Ecuador
 Edson Montaño – Newcastle Jets – 2014–15
 Edmundo Zura – Newcastle Jets – 2008

England

 Charlie Austin – Brisbane Roar – 2022
 David Ball – Wellington Phoenix – 2019–
 Guy Bates – Newcastle Jets – 2005
 Darren Bazeley – New Zealand Knights – 2005–07
 Mark Beevers – Perth Glory – 2022–
 Michael Bridges – Sydney FC – 2007–08, Newcastle Jets – 2009–14
 Wayne Brown – Newcastle Jets – 2016–18
 Malik Buari – New Zealand Knights – 2006–07
 Ronnie Bull – New Zealand Knights – 2005–06
 Jacob Butterfield – Melbourne Victory – 2020–21
 Zach Clough – Adelaide United – 2022–
 Ben Collett – New Zealand Knights – 2006
 Terry Cooke – North Queensland Fury – 2009–10
 John Curtis – Gold Coast United – 2010–11
 Brian Deane – Perth Glory – 2005
 Matt Derbyshire – Macarthur FC – 2020–21
 Neil Emblen – New Zealand Knights – 2005–07
 Robbie Fowler – North Queensland Fury – 2009–10, Perth Glory – 2010–11
 Macaulay Gillesphey – Brisbane Roar – 2019–2021
 Sam Graham – Central Coast Mariners – 2019
 Chris Greenacre – Wellington Phoenix – 2009–12
 Dean Gordon – New Zealand Knights – 2006–07
 Shayon Harrison – Melbourne City – 2019
 Daniel Heffernan – Central Coast Mariners – 2015–16
 Emile Heskey – Newcastle Jets – 2012–14
 Gary Hooper – Wellington Phoenix – 2019–20, 2021–22
 Mark Hughes – North Queensland Fury – 2010–11
 Francis Jeffers – Newcastle Jets – 2010–11, 2011–12
 Carl Jenkinson – Melbourne City – 2022, Newcastle Jets – 2022–
 Joe Keenan – Melbourne Victory – 2007–08, Adelaide United – 2010–11
 Geoff Kellaway – Melbourne Victory – 2010–11
 Adam Le Fondre – Sydney FC – 2018–
 Mark Lee – Perth Glory – 2006–07, 2008–09
 Joe Lolley – Sydney FC – 2022–
 Steve McMahon – Perth Glory – 2005–06
 Callum McManaman – Melbourne Victory – 2020–21
 Joseph Mills – Perth Glory – 2016–18
 Jordon Mutch – Western Sydney Wanderers – 2021, Macarthur FC – 2021–2022
 Craig Noone – Melbourne City – 2019–21, Macarthur FC – 2021–
 James Robinson – Melbourne Victory – 2006–07, Perth Glory – 2007–09, North Queensland Fury – 2009–10
 Jack Rodwell – Western Sydney Wanderers – 2021–22, Sydney FC – 2022–
 Ryan Shotton – Melbourne Victory – 2020–21
 Daniel Sturridge – Perth Glory – 2021–22
 John Sutton – Central Coast Mariners – 2012
 Steven Taylor – Wellington Phoenix – 2018–20, 2021
 Andy Todd – Perth Glory – 2009–11
 Nicky Travis – Central Coast Mariners – 2009–10
 Scott Wootton – Wellington Phoenix – 2022–
 Simon Yeo – New Zealand Knights – 2005

Eritrea
 Ambesager Yosief – Gold Coast United – 2011–12

Fiji
 Roy Krishna – Wellington Phoenix – 2014–19

Finland
 Aleksandr Kokko – Newcastle Jets – 2016–17
 Thomas Lam – Melbourne City – 2022–
 Juho Mäkelä – Sydney FC – 2011–12

France
 Romain Amalfitano – Western Sydney Wanderers – 2022–
 Éric Bauthéac – Brisbane Roar – 2017–19
 Florin Berenguer – Melbourne City – 2018–
 Damien Da Silva – Melbourne Victory – 2023–
 Matthieu Delpierre – Melbourne Victory – 2014–16
 William Gallas – Perth Glory – 2013–14
 Béni Nkololo – Central Coast Mariners – 2021–
 Loïc Puyo – Macarthur FC – 2020–21
 Morgan Schneiderlin – Western Sydney Wanderers – 2023–

Georgia
 Bachana Arabuli – Macarthur FC – 2022–
 Beka Dartsmelia – Newcastle Jets – 2022–
 Beka Mikeltadze – Newcastle Jets – 2021–

Germany
 Daniel Adlung – Adelaide United – 2017–18
 Alexander Baumjohann – Western Sydney Wanderers – 2018–19, Sydney FC – 2019–21
 Maximilian Beister – Melbourne Victory – 2016–17
 Mirko Boland – Adelaide United – 2018–20
 Thomas Broich – Brisbane Roar – 2010–17
 André Gumprecht – Central Coast Mariners – 2005–09
 Tim Hoogland – Melbourne Victory – 2019–20
 André Kilian – North Queensland Fury – 2010–11
 Sebastian Langkamp – Perth Glory – 2021
 Alexander Meier – Western Sydney Wanderers – 2019–20
 Nicolai Müller – Western Sydney Wanderers – 2019–21, Central Coast Mariners – 2021–2022
 Georg Niedermeier – Melbourne Victory – 2018–19
 Dragan Paljić – Perth Glory – 2015
 Peter Perchtold – Gold Coast United – 2011
 Jérome Polenz – Western Sydney Wanderers – 2012–14, Brisbane Roar – 2015–16
 Matti Steinmann – Wellington Phoenix – 2019–20, Brisbane Roar – 2021–22
 Marcus Wedau – Queensland Roar – 2006–07

Ghana
 Paul Ayongo – Central Coast Mariners – 2022–
 Hamza Mohammed – New Zealand Knights – 2006
 Lloyd Owusu – Adelaide United – 2009–10

Greece
 Panagiotis Kone – Western United – 2019–20
 Avraam Papadopoulos – Brisbane Roar – 2017–19
 Savvas Siatravanis – Newcastle Jets – 2021–22

Hungary
 György Sándor – Perth Glory – 2015–16
 Krisztián Vadócz – Perth Glory – 2016
 Richárd Vernes – Central Coast Mariners – 2014–15

Indonesia
 Syahrian Abimanyu – Newcastle Jets – 2021
 Sergio van Dijk – Brisbane Roar – 2008–10, Adelaide United – 2010–13

Iran
 Reza Ghoochannejhad – Sydney FC – 2019

Iraq
 Ali Abbas – Newcastle Jets – 2009–12, 2020–21, Sydney FC – 2012–16, Wellington Phoenix – 2017–18

Ireland
 Simon Cox – Western Sydney Wanderers – 2020–21
 Sean Devine – New Zealand Knights – 2005–07
 Damien Duff – Melbourne City – 2014–15
 Steven Gray – Melbourne Heart – 2012–13
 Wes Hoolahan – Newcastle Jets – 2019–20
 Andy Keogh – Perth Glory – 2014–19, 2020–22
 Stephen Mallon – Central Coast Mariners – 2019
 Aaron McEneff – Perth Glory – 2022–
 Billy Mehmet – Perth Glory – 2011–13
 Liam Miller – Perth Glory – 2011–13, Brisbane Roar – 2013–14, Melbourne City – 2014
 Roy O'Donovan – Central Coast Mariners – 2015–17, Newcastle Jets – 2017–19, 2020–21, Brisbane Roar – 2019–20
 Jay O'Shea – Brisbane Roar – 2019–
 Wayne O'Sullivan – Central Coast Mariners – 2005–07
 Cillian Sheridan  – Wellington Phoenix – 2019
 Shaun Timmins – Wellington Phoenix – 2014

Israel
 Ben Azubel – Perth Glory – 2022
 Tomer Hemed – Wellington Phoenix – 2020–21, Western Sydney Wanderers – 2021–22

Italy
 Benito Carbone – Sydney FC – 2006
 Alessandro Del Piero – Sydney FC – 2012–14
 Alessandro Diamanti – Western United – 2019–
 Marcello Fiorentini – Newcastle Jets – 2010–11
 Massimo Maccarone – Brisbane Roar – 2017–18
 Francesco Margiotta – Melbourne Victory – 2021–22
 Andrea Migliorini – Melbourne Heart – 2013–14
 Federico Piovaccari – Western Sydney Wanderers – 2015–16
 Manuel Pucciarelli – Melbourne City – 2021–22
 Marco Rossi – Wellington Phoenix – 2016–18
 Fabio Vignaroli – Newcastle Jets – 2009–10

Ivory Coast
 Eugène Dadi – Perth Glory – 2008–10, Wellington Phoenix – 2010
 Jonas Salley – New Zealand Knights – 2006–07, Sydney FC 2007, Adelaide United – 2007–09, Gold Coast United – 2011–12
 Adama Traoré – Gold Coast United – 2009–12, Melbourne Victory – 2012–14, 2019–21, Western Sydney Wanderers – 2021–

Jamaica
 Adrian Mariappa – Macarthur FC – 2021–22

Japan
 Riku Danzaki – Brisbane Roar – 2020–21, 2022–23
 Tsubasa Endoh – Melbourne City – 2022
 Cy Goddard – Central Coast Mariners – 2021–22
 Keisuke Honda – Melbourne Victory – 2018–19
 Hiroshi Ibusuki – Adelaide United – 2022–
 Tomoki Imai – Western United – 2020–
 Hiroyuki Ishida – Perth Glory – 2005–06
 Kojiro Kaimoto – North Queensland Fury – 2009
 Masato Kudo – Brisbane Roar – 2020–21
 Jumpei Kusukami – Western Sydney Wanderers – 2016–18
 Kazuyoshi Miura – Sydney FC – 2005
 Hirofumi Moriyasu – Sydney FC  – 2010–12
 Ryo Nagai – Perth Glory – 2012–14
 Keijiro Ogawa – Western Sydney Wanderers – 2021–22
 Shinji Ono – Western Sydney Wanderers – 2012–14
 Kosuke Ota – Perth Glory – 2020–22
 Manabu Saitō – Newcastle Jets – 2023–
 Yojiro Takahagi – Western Sydney Wanderers – 2015
 Yuji Takahashi – Brisbane Roar – 2012–13
 Yūsuke Tanaka – Western Sydney Wanderers – 2015
 Naoki Tsubaki – Melbourne City – 2020–21
 Ryo Wada – Brisbane Roar – 2022

Kosovo
 Besart Berisha – Brisbane Roar – 2011–14, Melbourne Victory – 2014–18, Western United – 2019–21
 Valon Berisha – Melbourne City – 2022–

Liberia
 Patrick Gerhardt – Melbourne Heart – 2012–14

Lithuania
 Darvydas Šernas – Perth Glory – 2014

Malaysia
 Matthew Davies – Perth Glory – 2013–15
 Brendan Gan – Sydney FC – 2008–11
 Liridon Krasniqi – Newcastle Jets – 2021

Mali
 Kalifa Cissé – Central Coast Mariners – 2018–19
 Tongo Doumbia – Western United – 2022–

Malta
 John Hutchinson – Central Coast Mariners – 2005–15
 Michael Mifsud – Melbourne Heart – 2013–14
 Manny Muscat – Wellington Phoenix – 2008–16, Melbourne City – 2016–18

Martinique
 Harry Novillo – Melbourne City – 2015–16

Mauritius
 Jonathan Bru – Melbourne Victory – 2012–14

Mexico
 Ulises Dávila – Wellington Phoenix – 2019–21, Macarthur FC – 2021–
 Gael Sandoval – Wellington Phoenix – 2022

Netherlands

 Paul Beekmans – Gold Coast United – 2011–12
 Pascal Bosschaart – Sydney FC – 2011–13
 Wout Brama – Central Coast Mariners – 2017–18
 Jordy Buijs – Sydney FC – 2017–18
 Romeo Castelen – Western Sydney Wanderers – 2014–16
 Donny de Groot – Newcastle Jets – 2009–10
 Siem de Jong – Sydney FC – 2018–19
 Orlando Engelaar – Melbourne Heart – 2013–14
 Leroy George – Melbourne Victory – 2017–18
 Youssouf Hersi – Western Sydney Wanderers – 2012–14, Perth Glory – 2014–15
 Tom Hiariej – Central Coast Mariners – 2017–19
 Kew Jaliens – Newcastle Jets – 2013–15, Melbourne City – 2015
 Peter Jungschläger – Gold Coast United – 2011–12
 Marcel Meeuwis – Melbourne Heart – 2013
 Luciano Narsingh – Sydney FC – 2022
 Stef Nijland – Brisbane Roar – 2013
 Bobby Petta – Adelaide United – 2006–08, Sydney FC – 2008
 Maceo Rigters – Gold Coast United – 2011–12
 Jeffrey Sarpong – Wellington Phoenix – 2015–16
 Bart Schenkeveld – Melbourne City – 2017–19
 Marcel Seip – Central Coast Mariners – 2013–14
 Gerald Sibon – Melbourne Heart – 2010–11
 Victor Sikora – Perth Glory – 2009–12
 Andwélé Slory – Adelaide United – 2011
 Jordy Thomassen – Adelaide United – 2019
 Bas van den Brink – Gold Coast United – 2009–11, Perth Glory – 2011–13
 Jop van der Linden – Sydney FC – 2018–19
 Richard van der Venne – Melbourne City – 2022–
 Frank van Eijs – New Zealand Knights – 2005–06
 Rob Wielaert – Melbourne City – 2013–15
 Rutger Worm – Melbourne Heart – 2010–12
 Patrick Zwaanswijk – Central Coast Mariners – 2010–13

Nigeria
 Seyi Adeleke – Western Sydney Wanderers – 2014–15
 Kelechi John – Central Coast Mariners – 2022–23

North Macedonia
 Daniel Georgievski – Melbourne Victory – 2014–17, Newcastle Jets – 2017–19, Western Sydney Wanderers – 2019–21, Melbourne City – 2021
 Mensur Kurtiši – Brisbane Roar – 2014–15

Northern Ireland
 Bobby Burns – Newcastle Jets – 2019–20
 Aaron Hughes – Melbourne City – 2015–16
 Terry McFlynn – Sydney FC – 2005–14
 Jonny Steele – Newcastle Jets – 2014

Norway
 Kristian Opseth – Adelaide United – 2019–20

Panama
 Abdiel Arroyo – Newcastle Jets – 2019–20
 Ricardo Clarke – Wellington Phoenix – 2012
 Yairo Yau – Sydney FC – 2012–14

Papua New Guinea
 Brad McDonald – North Queensland Fury – 2010–11, Central Coast Mariners – 2011–13; 2016–17

Paraguay
 Fernando Romero – Melbourne Victory – 2023–

Philippines
 Iain Ramsay – Sydney FC – 2009–10, Adelaide United – 2010–13, Melbourne City 2013–15

Poland
 Marcin Budziński – Melbourne City – 2017–18
 Michał Janota – Central Coast Mariners – 2020–21
 Michał Kopczyński – Wellington Phoenix – 2018–19
 Filip Kurto – Wellington Phoenix – 2018–19, Western United – 2019–21, Macarthur FC – 2021–
 Adrian Mierzejewski – Sydney FC – 2017–18
 Oskar Zawada – Wellington Phoenix – 2022–

Portugal
 Fábio Ferreira – Adelaide United – 2012–15, Central Coast Mariners – 2015–17, Sydney FC – 2018, Perth Glory – 2018–19
 Roderick Miranda – Melbourne Victory – 2021–
 Nani – Melbourne Victory – 2022–
 Nuno Reis – Melbourne City – 2021–
 Dani Rodrigues – New Zealand Knights – 2006–07

Romania
 Lucian Goian – Perth Glory – 2017

Scotland

 Tom Aldred – Brisbane Roar – 2019–
 Marc Anthony – Perth Glory – 2008–09
 Grant Brebner – Melbourne Victory – 2006–12
 Chris Doig – Central Coast Mariners – 2009–11
 Graham Dorrans – Western Sydney Wanderers – 2020–21
 Ian Ferguson – Central Coast Mariners – 2005–06
 Scot Gemmill – New Zealand Knights – 2006–07
 Ziggy Gordon – Central Coast Mariners – 2019–20, Western Sydney Wanderers – 2020–22
 Jack Hendry – Melbourne City – 2020
 Simon Lynch – Queensland Roar – 2006–08
 Bob Malcolm – Brisbane Roar – 2009–10
 Ross McCormack – Melbourne City – 2017–18, Central Coast Mariners – 2018–19
 Steven McGarry – Perth Glory – 2010–14
 Charlie Miller – Brisbane Roar – 2008–09, Gold Coast United – 2009–10
 Nick Montgomery – Central Coast Mariners – 2012–17
 Michael O'Halloran – Melbourne City – 2018–19
 Stewart Petrie – Central Coast Mariners – 2005–07
 Grant Smith – North Queensland Fury – 2009
 Scott Wilson – North Queensland Fury – 2009–10

Senegal
 Baba Diawara – Adelaide United – 2017–19
 Jacques Faty – Sydney FC – 2015–16, Central Coast Mariners – 2016–17
 Malick Mané – Central Coast Mariners – 2014
 Mickaël Tavares – Sydney FC – 2015–16, Central Coast Mariners – 2016–17

Serbia
 Enver Alivodić – Newcastle Jets – 2015–16
 Ranko Despotović – Sydney FC – 2013–14
 Miloš Dimitrijević – Sydney FC – 2014–17
 Milan Đurić – Central Coast Mariners – 2019–20
 Stefan Janković – Central Coast Mariners – 2020–21
 Branko Jelić – Perth Glory – 2009–11
 Milan Jovanić – Perth Glory – 2005–06
 Andrija Kaluđerović – Brisbane Roar – 2015, Wellington Phoenix – 2017–18
 Matija Ljujić – Wellington Phoenix – 2018
 Nebojša Marinković – Perth Glory – 2014–17
 Miloš Ninković – Sydney FC – 2015–22, Western Sydney Wanderers  – 2022–
 Nikola Petković – Sydney FC – 2013–15
 Aleksandar Prijović – Western United – 2021–
 Stefan Šćepović – Brisbane Roar – 2023–
 Milan Smiljanić – Perth Glory – 2016–17
 Miloš Trifunović – Newcastle Jets – 2015–16

Singapore
 Safuwan Baharudin – Melbourne City – 2015

Slovakia
 Filip Hološko – Sydney FC – 2015–17
 Karol Kisel – Sydney FC – 2009–10, 2011–12
 Róbert Mak – Sydney FC – 2022–

Slovenia
 Džengis Čavušević – Adelaide United – 2018
 Robert Koren – Melbourne City – 2014–16
 Denis Kramar – Perth Glory – 2015
 Rene Krhin – Western United – 2021–22
 Tomislav Mišura – Newcastle Jets – 2010–11

Solomon Islands
 Henry Fa'arodo – Perth Glory – 2005–06
 Benjamin Totori – Wellington Phoenix – 2012–13

South Korea
 Byun Sung-hwan – Sydney FC – 2009–11, Newcastle Jets – 2011–12
 Danny Choi – Adelaide United – 2016
 Do Dong-hyun – Brisbane Roar – 2012–13
 Kim Eun-sun – Central Coast Mariners – 2019–20
 Kim Jae-sung – Adelaide United – 2017
 Kim Seung-yong – Central Coast Mariners – 2014
 Kim Soo-beom – Perth Glory – 2019–20
 Kim Sung-kil – Gold Coast United – 2011
 Lee Ki-je – Newcastle Jets – 2015
 Seo Hyuk-su – Brisbane Roar – 2005–09
 Shin In-seob – Adelaide United – 2009–11
 Shin Tae-yong – Queensland Roar – 2004–05
 Song Jin-hyung – Newcastle Jets – 2008–10

South Sudan
 Kenny Athiu – Melbourne Victory – 2017–20
 Abraham Majok – Western Sydney Wanderers – 2016–19, Central Coast Mariners – 2019–20
 Yagoub Mustafa – Perth Glory – 2017–18
 Valentino Yuel – Western United – 2019–20, Newcastle Jets – 2020–22

Spain

 Alberto – Western Sydney Wanderers – 2015–16
 Andreu – Western Sydney Wanderers – 2015–16, Perth Glory – 2017–18
 Manuel Arana – Brisbane Roar – 2016–17
 Mario Arqués – Newcastle Jets – 2021–22
 Asdrúbal – Central Coast Mariners – 2017–18
 Raúl Baena – Melbourne Victory – 2018–19
 Alan Baró – Melbourne Victory – 2016–17, Central Coast Mariners – 2017–18
 Beñat – Macarthur FC – 2020–21
 Aritz Borda – Western Sydney Wanderers – 2016–17
 Diego Caballo – Sydney FC – 2022–
 Cadete – Melbourne Victory – 2022–
 Diego Castro – Perth Glory – 2015–21
 Álvaro Cejudo – Western Sydney Wanderers – 2017–18
 Sergio Cirio – Adelaide United – 2013–17
 Corona – Brisbane Roar – 2015–16
 Dimas – Western Sydney Wanderers – 2015–17
 Luis García – Central Coast Mariners – 2016
 Sergi Guardiola – Adelaide United – 2016–17
 Iker Guarrotxena – Western United – 2021
 Javier Hervás – Brisbane Roar – 2015–16
 Juande – Perth Glory – 2018–20, Adelaide United – 2021–
 Raúl Llorente – Western Sydney Wanderers – 2017–19
 Álex López – Brisbane Roar – 2018–19
 Javi López – Adelaide United – 2020–
 Ubay Luzardo – Melbourne Victory – 2012
 Mandi – Wellington Phoenix – 2018–19
 Rai Marchán – Melbourne Victory – 2021–
 Tomás Mejías – Western Sydney Wanderers – 2021–22
 Miguel Palanca – Adelaide United – 2015
 Albert Riera – Wellington Phoenix – 2013–16
 Oriol Riera – Western Sydney Wanderers – 2017–19
 Alex Rodriguez – Wellington Phoenix – 2014–17
 Dani Sánchez – Wellington Phoenix – 2011–13
 Pablo Sánchez – Adelaide United – 2014–16
 Víctor Sánchez – Western United – 2020–21
 Adrián Sardinero – Perth Glory – 2021–
 Markel Susaeta – Melbourne City – 2020, Macarthur FC – 2020–21
 Xavi Torres – Perth Glory – 2017–18
 David Villa – Melbourne City – 2014

Sweden
 Ola Toivonen – Melbourne Victory – 2018–20

Switzerland
 Remo Buess – Queensland Roar – 2005–07
 Grégory Duruz – New Zealand Knights – 2006
 Stephan Keller – Sydney FC – 2009–11
 Léo Lacroix – Western United – 2021–
 Daniel Lopar – Western Sydney Wanderers – 2019–20
 Dominik Ritter – Newcastle Jets – 2012–13
 Pirmin Schwegler – Western Sydney Wanderers – 2019–20
 Gregory Wüthrich – Perth Glory – 2019–20

Thailand
 Surat Sukha – Melbourne Victory – 2009–11
 Sutee Suksomkit – Melbourne Victory – 2009

Timor-Leste
 Jesse Pinto – Newcastle Jets – 2009

Togo
 Eric Akoto – North Queensland Fury – 2010–11

Trinidad and Tobago
 Tony Warner – Wellington Phoenix – 2011–12
 Dwight Yorke – Sydney FC – 2005–06

Tunisia
 Fahid Ben Khalfallah – Melbourne Victory – 2014–17, Brisbane Roar – 2017–18
 Salim Khelifi – Perth Glory – 2022–
 Amor Layouni – Western Sydney Wanderers – 2023–

Turkey
 Ersan Gülüm – Adelaide United – 2017–18, Western United – 2019–20
 Jem Karacan – Central Coast Mariners – 2019

Uganda
 Eugene Sseppuya – North Queensland Fury – 2010

Ukraine
 Yevhen Levchenko – Adelaide United – 2011–12

United States
 Tyler Boyd – Wellington Phoenix – 2012–15
 Michael Enfield – Sydney FC – 2007–09
 Jason Romero – Macarthur FC – 2023–
 Alex Smith – Wellington Phoenix – 2011–13

Uruguay
 Javier Cabrera – Melbourne City – 2019–20
 Osvaldo Carro – Queensland Roar – 2005–06
 Mateo Corbo – Newcastle Jets – 2005–06
 Adrián Luna – Melbourne City – 2019–21
 Bruno Piñatares – Western Sydney Wanderers – 2016–17
 Francisco Usúcar – Adelaide United – 2011–12

Vanuatu
 Mitch Cooper – Gold Coast United – 2012, Newcastle Jets – 2012–17
 Brian Kaltak – Central Coast Mariners – 2022–

Venezuela
 Ronald Vargas – Newcastle Jets – 2017–19

Wales
 Aaron Amadi-Holloway – Brisbane Roar – 2019–20
 Matt Crowell – Central Coast Mariners – 2009–10
 Joe Ledley – Newcastle Jets – 2020

See also
 A-League Men records and statistics
 List of foreign A-League Men goalscorers

Notes

References
General

Australia
A-League Men lists
Association football player non-biographical articles